Three Dog Night (also known as One) is the debut album by American rock band Three Dog Night. The album was originally released by Dunhill Records on October 16, 1968. The album is known for featuring the band's Top 5 hit single, their cover of Harry Nilsson's song "One".

The album made the Top 20 on the albums charts in the United States and Canada. It has been reissued multiple times by Dunhill, MCA, and Geffen record labels.

Background, recording, and production 
In 1967, Three Dog Night was founded by Danny Hutton, Cory Wells, Chuck Negron, Joe Schermie, Floyd Sneed, Jimmy Greenspoon, and Michael Allsup. The group was a successful live act in Los Angeles and gathered considerable attention by several record labels. After a show at the Troubadour, the group was signed to the Dunhill ABC label, and the band started work on their first studio album.

Three Dog Night was recorded at American Recording Company. Producing the sessions was Gabriel Mekler, who had previously worked with Steppenwolf, and was engineered by Richard Podolor – who would later become the band's producer – and Bill Cooper.

Singles and artwork 
The first single to be released from Three Dog Night was "Nobody" b/w "It's for You" in November 1968, followed by "Try a Little Tenderness" b/w "Bet No One Ever Hurt This Bad" in January 1969. The last single released from the album was "One" b/w "Chest Fever" in April 1969.

The album's cover art, designed by Gary Burden, originally only had the name of the group on the front cover. After "Nobody" and "Try a Little Tenderness" were released as singles to only moderate success, the band began work on a follow-up album, Suitable for Framing.  During planning for Suitable for Framing'''s release, however, Three Dog Night singer Chuck Negron approached Dunhill ABC executives asking that "One" (which Negron sang lead on) be considered as the band's next single. The label released "One" as a single in several test markets, and the record quickly became Three Dog Night's first bona fide hit, ultimately peaking at #5 on the US charts. The title "One" was added under the group's name on the album's cover to capitalize on the song's popularity.

 Critical reception 

Writing for The New York Times in 1969, Robert Christgau regarded Three Dog Night as a successful attempt at rock music interpretation:

 Track listing 
"One" (Harry Nilsson) – 3:00
"Nobody" (Beth Beatty, Dick Cooper, Ernie Shelby) – 2:18
"Heaven Is in Your Mind" (Jim Capaldi, Steve Winwood, Chris Wood) – 2:55
"It's for You" (Lennon–McCartney) – 1:40
"Let Me Go" (Danny Whitten) – 2:24
"Chest Fever" (J.R. Robertson) – 4:40
"Find Someone to Love" (Johnny "Guitar" Watson) – 2:00
"Bet No One Ever Hurt This Bad" (Randy Newman) – 4:03
"Don't Make Promises" (Tim Hardin) – 2:45
"The Loner" (Neil Young) – 2:32
"Try a Little Tenderness" (Jimmy Campbell, Reginald Connelly, Harry M. Woods) – 4:05 (timing mistakenly listed at 3:05 on album labels and cover)

 Personnel 
The following people contributed to Three Dog Night'':
Cory Wells – lead vocals (tracks 2-8, 11), background vocals
Chuck Negron – lead vocals (tracks 1, 9), background vocals 
Danny Hutton – lead vocals (track 10), background vocals
Michael Allsup – guitars
Joe Schermie – bass
Floyd Sneed – drums, percussion
Jimmy Greenspoon – keyboards
Technical
Gabriel Mekler – producer
Richard Podolor – engineer
Bill Cooper – engineer

Charts and certifications

Album

Singles

References 

Three Dog Night albums
1968 debut albums
Albums produced by Gabriel Mekler
Dunhill Records albums
Stateside Records albums
MCA Records albums